William Herbert Layton (13 January 1915 – February 1984) was an English footballer who played as a wing half. Layton was born in Shirley, and made appearances in the Football League for Reading, Bradford Park Avenue and Colchester United. He also played in the Southern League for Colchester before their admission to the Football League.

In 1951, Layton left League football to become player-manager at amateur side Harwich & Parkeston. Under his management, the club reached the final of the FA Amateur Cup in 1953. At the end of the 1953–54 season, Layton retired from football to focus on managing the Garland Hotel in Parkeston.

Honours
 Colchester United
 Southern League runner-up: 1949–50
 Southern League Cup: 1949–50

References

External links
Profile at Neil Brown's site

1915 births
1984 deaths
Association football wing halves
English footballers
Reading F.C. players
Bradford (Park Avenue) A.F.C. players
Colchester United F.C. players
Harwich & Parkeston F.C. players
Southern Football League players
English Football League players